DYBB-TV, channel 2, is a commercial television station owned by GMA Network Inc. in Kalibo, Aklan. Its transmitter are located at Barangay Bulwang, Numancia, Aklan.

GMA TV-2 Kalibo programs
One Western Visayas (Monday to Friday) - GMA Iloilo flagship newscast
GMA Regional TV Early Edition

See also
DYRU
DYXX-TV
List of GMA Network stations

GMA Network stations
Television stations in Aklan
Television channels and stations established in 2001
Kalibo